"Heaven's Just a Sin Away" is a song composed by Jerry Gillespie, which was recorded in 1977 by The Kendalls. Released in 1977, the song went to No. 1 on the Billboard Hot Country Singles (now Hot Country Songs) charts. It was the duo's first top-40 entry on that chart, and the second single from the album Heaven's Just a Sin Away, released on Ovation. It also reached No. 69 on the Billboard Hot 100.

The song won the Kendalls a Grammy Award for Best Country Performance by a Duo or Group with Vocal and Single of the Year win from the Country Music Association.

Kelly Willis recorded the song on her 1993 album Kelly Willis for MCA Nashville Records. Her version, the second and final single from that album, reached No. 63 on the country singles charts that year.

In 2009, former Creedence Clearwater Revival vocalist/guitarist John Fogerty recorded the song for his The Blue Ridge Rangers Rides Again album.

Chart performance

The Kendalls

Kelly Willis

References

1977 singles
1993 singles
The Kendalls songs
Kelly Willis songs
Songs written by Jerry Gillespie
1977 songs